Symphyotrichum leone (formerly Aster leonis) is a species of flowering plant in the family Asteraceae native to Cuba. It is also spelled Symphyotrichum leonis.

Citations

References

leone
Flora of Cuba
Plants described in 1920
Taxa named by Nathaniel Lord Britton
Flora without expected TNC conservation status